Experiential gifts also known as gift experiences and experience gifts, as opposed to material gifts or simply “stuff”, allow the recipient to have an experience, such as skydiving, kayaking, race car driving or touring a vineyard. Purchases typically take the form of vouchers or gift certificates via email or retailed boxes.

Pioneered in the UK in the 1990s, experiential gifts now represent one of the faster-growing segments of the $253 billion a year gift industry.

Groups
Experiential gifts fall into a number of categories but the sector is always innovating and introducing new experiences :
 Adventure – indoor skydiving, parachuting, microlight, helicopter rides, fixed wing flying, kayaking, whitewater rafting, hang gliding, sailing
 Driving – supercars, rallying, Movie and muscle cars, junior driving, classic cars, drifting, karting
 Casual dining and gourmet –  gin tasting and distillery tours, cookery lessons, chocolate making, eating out
 Environmentally friendly – Segway, city tours, whale watching
 Attractions - the Shard, the London Eye, the British Airways 360 in Brighton
 Beauty and wellbeing  – spa treatments, pilates, stone massages
 Travel – weekend getaways, golfing breaks, 
 Music – Recording studio sessions

History
In  the United Kingdom, Acorne Sports and  Red Letter Days, were two companys that gave experience gifts. Red Letter Days was founded in 1989 by Rachel Elnaugh, who reportedly came up with the idea of gift experiences after looking for a creative way to give her father tickets to an England cricket team match. The success of Red Letter Days led to Elnaugh winning the Ernst & Young Entrepreneur of the Year Award in 2002 and a role as a Dragon on BBCTV's Dragon's Den. Red Letter Days was purchased out of administration in August 2005 by Theo Paphitis and Peter Jones. The heavily indebted business was turned round under a new Chief Executive, returned to profitability and sold to its major international rival, Smartbox Group, in 2017.

Acorne Sports was founded in the same year as Red Letter Days. Richard Gyselynck, had the idea of packaging the 30 minute Introductory Flying Lesson as a Gift Experience. Acorne marketed via shopping catalogues and magazine small ads before joining the move to on line marketing. Acorne was later renamed Virgin Experience Days and grew to become a market leader, leading to its purchase by private equity investors Inflexion in 2017.

Activity Superstore is the leading supplier of gift experiences to the retail sector and has recently scaled its on line offer up significantly with its purchase of the Find Me A Gift business out of administration. Specialist digital agencies including Trackdays.co.uk and Into the Blue focus on popular experience categories such as driving and flying. There are a number of locally focused experience gift companies operating on a very small scale and serving a niche in the market, such as Uniquely Local which features gift experiences local to Yorkshire and The Indytute which has a range of London-based experiences.

Buy a Gift, now part of the SmartBox Group, was first to market with an on line gift experience platform. Started by Dan Mountain in 1999, who remains its UK CEO, Buy a Gift grew quickly as internet shopping became established in the UK and overtook the pioneer agencies in revenue terms.

WonderDays are cutting edge with their innovative shopping platform as they have vouchers with a QR code that auto-fills information to activate it, free exchanges and instant email delivery.

Large agencies such as Smartbox and Virgin Experience Days have annual sales of around £60 million in the UK, and the next tier of agencies including Activity Superstore, Trackdays and Into the Blue have annual sales of between £6 million and £20 million in the UK. Micro agencies such as Uniquely Local and Indytube measure their annual sales at under £100,000 per annum. Date Night Away are a new agency formed in 2021, specialising in experiental gifts with suitable accommodation options nearby.

Experience gift companies launched across Europe following the success of Red Letter Days and the largest Australian experience gift company, RedBalloon, was founded in 2001. By 2010, nearly all EU countries had an established experience gift provider from the larger states such as Germany through to the small countries such as Cyprus.. There are a number of international gift experience brands such as the market leading Smartbox Group and the small privately owned on pack promotion specialists Golden Moments. 

While popular in both Europe and Australia, the idea of experience gifts did not hit the mainstream in the US until 2004–2005. Between 2004 and 2005, the four largest US-based experience gift companies – Great American Days (2004), Excitations (2005) Cloud 9 Living (2005), Xperience Days (2004) – were founded.  All four continue to operate today.Geographical challenges, cultural differences and state legislation on gift vouchers and gift cards make the US a complex market to operate in.

Market surveys
As of 2009, the experiential gift market is an established, highly competitive multi million-dollar market in the United Kingdom and in Australia and an emerging category in the U.S.A.

A survey conducted in November 2005 by American Express found that experiential gift giving was on the rise: 30% of those surveyed planned on giving experiential gifts that year versus 23% the prior year. The survey also found that experiential gifts were particularly popular among consumers aged 18–44. A survey published in 2007 by Mintel estimated the UK gift experience market to be worth £98 million but by 2018, just over ten years later, the combined U.K. sales of gift experiences by the major gift experience agencies, Buyagift, Red Letter Days, Virgin and Activity Superstore exceeded £125 million.

According to the same American Express survey, the growth of interest in buying experience gifts in the UK is:

Experiential gifts also capitalise on consumers' growing comfort with purchasing gifts online. According to a December 2012 survey, 69 percent of UK experience days were bought online.

List
w:fr:Wonderbox (France)
w:fr:Smartbox (France)
w:fr:Dakotabox (France)
Cloud 9 Living (US)
Xperience Days (US)
RedBalloon (Australia)
Red Letter Days (UK)
My Days (Germany)
Virgin Experience Days (UK)
Gifting Owl (Worldwide)
Banana Lab (Australia)

See also 
 Alternative giving
 Ethical consumerism
 Green gifting
 Regifting

References

Giving